Antonio "Tony" De Nobrega (born 2 February 1969 in Cape Town) is a South African football (soccer) coach who currently manages National First Division club Vasco da Gama.

He managed Premier Soccer League club Bloemfontein Celtic from February 2006 until April 2007.

References

1969 births
Living people
South African soccer managers
Sportspeople from Cape Town
South African people of Portuguese descent